The Armed Forces Command and Staff College, Jaji is a training facility for the Nigerian Armed Forces, including the army, air force and navy. It is currently headed by Air Vice Marshal OA TUWASE.

History
The Armed Forces Command and Staff College opened at Jaji in May 1976, giving two senior officers' courses. In April 1978, the college was expanded when the Army Junior Division was established to conduct courses for Captains in the Nigerian Army.
A Demonstration Battalion, the Army School of Artillery, and armor support from a composite armored battalion in Kaduna were also located at Jaji.
In September 1978, with the opening of the air faculty, Jaji was redesignated the Command and Staff College. The Navy Faculty was established in September 1981, assembling all senior military divisions in one campus. By 1986, 1,172 officers had graduated from Jaji's senior divisions, and 1,320 from the junior divisions.

The original senior officers' courses were based on a curriculum derived from that of the British Army Staff College, Camberley, and the college establishment was assisted by an advisory team from the British Army. The successor to the advisory team, the Joint Warfare Advisory Team, remained until October 1988.

In September 2005, United Kingdom Armed Forces Minister Adam Ingram visited Jaji and announced that an extra 200,000 UK pounds would be allocated to assist training of over 17,000 Nigerian troops as peacekeepers in Africa.
In November 2006, the Prince of Wales of the United Kingdom visited Nigeria and inspected soldiers at Jaji.

Courses and facilities
In order to achieve its mission, the college runs three courses, namely:
 Senior Course for Majors and their equivalent,
 Junior Course for Captains and their equivalent, and
 Staff Duties Course for Senior NCOs (Non Commissioned Officers) of the 3 Services. The Senior Divisions of the Land, Maritime and Air Warfare Departments conduct a one - year joint course per academic year for the officers of the rank of major or its equivalent.

The Junior Courses of the three departments conduct two 20-week courses for officers of the rank of captain in the Army or its equivalent in each academic year. Successful students are awarded Pass Staff Course (psc) and Pass Junior Staff Course (pjsc) at the end of the Senior and Junior Courses respectively.

Notable staff
Abdulmumini Aminu, governor of Borno State
Azubuike Ihejirika, former  Chief of Army Staff
Dan Archibong, former military governor of Cross River State
Dele Joseph Ezeoba, former Chief of Naval Staff
Emmanuel Acholonu, later administrator of Katsina State
Gideon Orkar, leader of the April 1990 coup
John Mark Inienger, commander of ECOMOG in Liberia
John Nanzip Shagaya, later a Senator
Joshua Anaja, former military governor of Plateau State
Martin Luther Agwai, Chief of Army Staff
Tukur Yusuf Buratai, Chief of Army Staff
Sani Bello, governor of Kano State
Suraj Abdurrahman, Command Officer in Charge of the Armed Forces of Liberia
Alwali Kazir, Chief of Army Staff
Oladipo Philip Ayeni, former Pioneer military governor of Bayelsa State

Notable alumni
Azubuike Ihejirika, former  Chief of Army Staff
Ibrahim Babangida, military ruler of Nigeria
Owoye Andrew Azazi, Chief of Army Staff and Chief of Defence Staff
Emmanuel Ukaegbu, later military Administrator of Anambra State
Jonah Wuyep, chief of the Air Staff
Femi John Femi, chief of Air Staff
Olagunsoye Oyinlola, governor of Osun State
Paul Obi, administrator of Bayelsa State
Abubakar Tanko Ayuba, governor of Kaduna State and Senator
Dominic Oneya, administrator of Kano State and Benue State
Amadi Ikwechegh, governor of Imo State
Tunji Olurin, governor of Oyo State, administrator of Ekiti State
Lawan Gwadabe, governor of Niger State
Oladipo Philip Ayeni, First Military Administrator of Bayelsa State

References

External links 

 
 

Educational institutions established in 1976
Staff colleges
Military education and training in Nigeria
1976 establishments in Nigeria